The Sebel Townhouse Hotel, formerly a hotel in Elizabeth Bay, New South Wales, Australia.

During the 1970s and 1980s, the Sebel Townhouse became the unofficial home of the Australian music industry. Australian artists met with touring guests like Elton John, David Bowie and Dire Straits. It features in the first few minutes of ABBA The Movie from 1977. In 1984 it hosted the reception of Elton John's wedding to Renate Blauel.

References 

  Hindsight, Radio National

External links 
 

Hotels in Sydney